Mapp v. Ohio, 367 U.S. 643 (1961), was a landmark decision of the U.S. Supreme Court in which the Court ruled that the exclusionary rule, which prevents prosecutors from using evidence in court that was obtained by violating the Fourth Amendment to the U.S. Constitution, applies not only to the federal government but also to the U.S. state governments. The Supreme Court accomplished this by use of a principle known as selective incorporation; in Mapp this involved the incorporation of the provisions, as interpreted by the Court, of the Fourth Amendment which is applicable only to actions of the federal government into the Fourteenth Amendment's due process clause which is applicable to actions of the states.

Legal background

The Fourth Amendment to the U.S. Constitution provides: "The right of the people to be secure in their persons, houses, papers, and effects, against unreasonable searches and seizures, shall not be violated ...."  Until the early 20th century, Americans' only legal remedy in cases where law enforcement officers violated the Fourth Amendment was a private lawsuit against the officers involved, either in trespass to recover damages or in replevin to recover their seized goods or property. This changed in 1914, when the U.S. Supreme Court unanimously ruled in Weeks v. United States that any evidence obtained by federal law enforcement officers in violation of the Fourth Amendment could not be used in federal criminal proceedings. In an opinion written by Justice William R. Day, the Court reasoned that the Supreme Court had a constitutional duty to ensure federal courts excluded illegally obtained evidence:

Over the next several decades, the Court generally held that this "exclusionary rule" only applied to cases in which federal law enforcement officers, not state officers, were involved in the illegal searches and seizures. In 1949, the Court confronted the issue of the exclusionary rule's application to states in the case of Wolf v. Colorado. The Wolf Court surveyed existing U.S. states and found that although 17 states had adopted the exclusionary rule of Weeks in their own state law, 30 others had rejected it. It therefore concluded that it was not a "departure from basic standards" of due process to allow states to introduce illegally obtained evidence in state trials. 

For the next 12 years, the Supreme Court only applied the exclusionary rule to evidence obtained by state officers for use in state court prosecutions when the state officers used coercion, violence, or brutality. For example, in the 1952 case Rochin v. California, the Court required a California state court to exclude evidence that state officers had illegally obtained, but only because the officers had used "conduct that shocks the conscience"specifically, they had a doctor give the suspect an emetic to force him to vomit up capsules he had swallowed.

Case history
Dollree "Dolly" Mapp was a young woman involved in the illegal gambling operations of mobster and racketeer Shondor Birns, who dominated organized crime in Cleveland, Ohio in the 1940s and 1950s. On May 23, 1957, Cleveland police received an anonymous tip that a man named Virgil Ogletree might be found at Mapp's house, along with illegal betting slips and equipment employed in a "numbers game" set up by Mapp's boyfriend. Ogletree was involved in the Cleveland illegal betting world, centered on the city's Short Vincent. He was wanted for questioning in the bombing of rival gambling racketeer (and future boxing promoter) Don King's home three days earlier. Three policemen went to Mapp's home and asked for permission to enter, but Mapp, after consulting her lawyer by telephone, refused to admit them without a search warrant. Two officers left, and one remained, watching the house from across the street.

Three hours later, more police officers arrived and knocked on the door. When Mapp did not answer, they forced the door open. Mapp asked to see their search warrant and was shown a piece of paper which she snatched away from an officer, putting it inside her dress. The officers struggled with Mapp and recovered the piece of paper which was not seen by her or her lawyers again, and was not introduced as evidence in any of the ensuing court proceedings. As the search of Mapp's second-floor, two-bedroom apartment began, police handcuffed her for being belligerent. The police searched the house thoroughly and discovered Ogletree, who was subsequently cleared on the bombing charge, hiding in the apartment of the downstairs tenant. In the search of Mapp's apartment and in a footlocker in the basement of the house, the police found betting slips. They also found a pistol and several pornographic books and pictures, which Mapp said a previous tenant had left behind. The police arrested Mapp and charged her with a misdemeanor count of possessing numbers-game paraphernalia, but she was acquitted.

Several months later, after Mapp refused to testify against Birns and his associates at their trial for the attempted shakedown of King, she was prosecuted for possession of the pornographic books. Mapp was found guilty at trial of "knowingly having had in her possession and under her control certain lewd and lascivious books, pictures, and photographs in violation of 2905.34 of Ohio's Revised Code", and sentenced to one to seven years in prison. Mapp was convicted even though prosecutors were unable to produce a valid search warrant. She appealed to the Supreme Court of Ohio, which affirmed her conviction because even though the search warrant's validity was doubtful and the police's search of her home was illegal, the police officers had not used brutal force against her, and so under the Supreme Court's precedents in Wolf and Rochin the exclusionary rule did not have to apply. Mapp then appealed to the U.S. Supreme Court, which agreed to hear her case.

Decision 
On June 19, 1961, the Supreme Court issued a 6–3 decision in favor of Mapp that overturned her conviction and held that the exclusionary rule applies to American states as well as the federal government.

Opinion of the Court 

Six justices formed the majority and joined an opinion written by justice Tom C. Clark. The Court observed that of the 30 U.S. states that had rejected the exclusionary rule at the time of Wolf v. Colorado in 1949, more than half had adopted at least a partial form of it in the intervening 12 years. Regarding its statements in Wolf that other preexisting remedies, like private lawsuits and good oversight of police forces, would be enough to enforce the Fourth Amendment, the Court said that experience had shown that "such remedies have been worthless and futile".

The Court then overruled Wolf and ruled that "all evidence obtained by searches and seizures in violation of the Constitution is, by that same authority, inadmissible in a state court." Justice Clark stated that without the exclusionary rule, the Fourth Amendment's protections against unreasonable searches and seizures would be merely "a form of words" that would be "valueless and undeserving of mention in a perpetual charter of inestimable human liberties". And because prior cases had ruled that the Fourteenth Amendment incorporated the Fourth Amendment against the states, the Court held that this reasoning applied equally to federal and state criminal proceedings. In a frequently quoted passage, the Court wrote:

Clark concluded the Court's opinion by reiterating how the "ignoble shortcut" around the Fourth Amendment that Wolf had left open to state law enforcement officers had "tend[ed] to destroy the entire system of constitutional restraints on which the liberties of the people rest," and reversed the Supreme Court of Ohio's judgment against Dolly Mapp.

Concurrences
Justice Hugo Black joined the majority opinion, but also wrote a concurring opinion in which he stated that although he thought that the Fourth Amendment alone was not enough to justify the exclusionary rule, when the Fourth Amendment's protections were combined with the Fifth Amendment's protection against self-incrimination, a resulting "constitutional basis emerges which not only justifies but actually requires the exclusionary rule."

Dissent
Three justices dissented from the Court's decision and joined an opinion written by Justice John Marshall Harlan II. Harlan wrote that the Court should not have reached the Fourth Amendment issues in the case because Mapp's conviction and the subsequent arguments at her appeals had focused on the legality of Ohio's anti-pornography laws, and not on the police officers' warrantless search of her home. Harlan wrote that the Court's decision in Wolf should be upheld per the principle of stare decisis, and that it did not require the entirety of the Fourth Amendment to be enforced against the states, but rather only the "principle of privacy which is at the core of the Fourth Amendment."

See also 
 United States Bill of Rights
 Fruit of the poisonous tree

References

Citations

Works cited

Further reading

External links 
 
 
 Archival source documents relating to the Mapp case at Cleveland Memory
 Dollree Mapp, Who Defied Police Search in Landmark Case, Is Dead - New York Times
 "Supreme Court Landmark Case Mapp v. Ohio" from C-SPAN's Landmark Cases: Historic Supreme Court Decisions

1961 in United States case law
20th-century American trials
American Civil Liberties Union litigation
Cleveland Division of Police
Cuyahoga County, Ohio
Incorporation case law
United States Fourth Amendment case law
United States privacy case law
United States Supreme Court cases of the Warren Court
United States Supreme Court decisions that overrule a prior Supreme Court decision
United States Supreme Court cases